Eric Hamilton Crake (25 January 1886 – 3 February 1948) was a Scottish cricketer. He was born at Madras in the British Raj, to Emily Noble Chase and the merchant and footballer William Crake.

Educated at Harrow School, where he captained the school's cricket team in 1905 and 1906, Crake was a batsman of unknown handedness. He made one appearance in first-class cricket for the Marylebone Cricket Club (MCC) against Oxford University in 1912 at the University Parks, Oxford. He batted once in the match, scoring a single run in the MCC's first-innings, before he was dismissed by Neville Fraser. The match ended in a draw.

He died at Nakuru in Kenya on 3 February 1948. His brother Ralph Crake was also a first-class cricketer.

References

External links
Eric Crake at ESPNcricinfo

1886 births
1948 deaths
Cricketers from Chennai
People educated at Harrow School
Scottish cricketers
Marylebone Cricket Club cricketers
English cricketers of 1890 to 1918
British people in colonial India